Berthe Girardet, née Imer (8 April 1861 – 6 December 1948) was a French sculptor. Her work was part of the art competitions at the 1924 Summer Olympics and the 1928 Summer Olympics.

References

External links

1861 births
1948 deaths
19th-century French sculptors
20th-century French sculptors
French women sculptors
Olympic competitors in art competitions
Sculptors from Marseille
20th-century French women artists